Dhvani Bhanushali (born 22 March 1998) is an Indian pop singer. Born in Mumbai, she gained popularity with her single Vaaste in 2019 which has crossed 1.4 billion views on YouTube, making her the youngest Indian pop star to have the fastest 1 billion views on YouTube. She started her music career in 2017 by singing acoustic version song Humsafar from Badrinath Ki Dulhania. Her first song in the film was Ishtehaar from the film Welcome To New York, released in 2018. In the same year she starred in the music video "Ishare Tere" with Guru Randhawa and "Dilbar" From Satyameva Jayate which was an instant hit.

Early life and career
Dhvani was born in Mumbai to father Vinod Bhanushali, who was the President of Global Marketing and Media Publishing for T-Series for 27 years until he quit the company in August 2021 to start his own venture Bhanushali Studios Limited and mother Rinku Bhanushali in a Hindu Kutchi family. She has a younger sister named Diya Bhanushali.

Dhvani, who made her debut with the songs "Humsafar Acoustic" from Badrinath Ki Dulhania, "Tere Mere Reprise" from Chef, "Veere" from Veere Di Wedding and "Ishtehaar" from the film Welcome To New York, later worked with Neha Kakkar on the song "Dilbar" and Guru Randhawa on the song "Ishare Tere". Her debut song was "Ishtehaar" from the film Welcome To New York, in which she sang with Rahat Fateh Ali Khan. Her song, "Dilbar", was the first Hindi language song to enter the Billboard Top Ten. She has released a carpool mashup of "Gulabi Aankhen" and "Shape of You". She has released the singles "Leja Re" and "Main Teri Hoon". She has sung "Duniya" from the movie Luka Chuppi along with Akhil. She has also sung the song "Laila" for the film Notebook. Her super hit single "Vaaste" along with Nikhil D'Souza, starring herself and Siddharth Gupta, gained 2 billion views and counting in June 2020 making her the fastest and youngest star to reach this mark. Next in cue was "Dariyaganj" along with Arijit Singh from the film Jai Mummy Di. She then sang "Nachi Nachi" from the movie Street Dancer 3D along with Neeti Mohan and Millind Gaba. She also sang "Jeetenge Hum" which was composed by DJ Chetas and Lijo George and penned by Manoj Muntashir and "Gallan Goriyan" composed by Taz and written by Kumaar during the Coronavirus lockdown in India. Later on, she sang "Baby Girl" along with Guru Randhawa which is composed and written by him too. The last song sung by her in 2020 is "Nayan" with Jubin Nautiyal which is composed by DJ Chetas and Lijo George and written by Manoj Muntashir. She released her new single "Radha" on her 23rd birthday. She also released a Gujarati song on the occasion of Navaratri 2021 Mehendi with 65 million views on her channel. Her Mera Yaar was released on 1 December 2021 with more than 50 million views. Her latest song, 'Candy' with Yuvan Shankar Raja released on Hitz Music's official YouTube channel. 

On working with Tanishk Bagchi, she commented that he is her mentor. She said, "He has guided me really well. My career is mostly made because of him."

She graduated from the University of Mumbai with Bachelor of Commerce in September 2019. She also has done a BME (Business Management & Entrepreneurship) from the Indian School of Management & Entrepreneurship, Mumbai.

Discography

Film songs

Originals/Music Videos

References

External links 

1998 births
Living people
21st-century Indian women singers
21st-century Indian singers
Bollywood playback singers
Singers from Mumbai
University of Mumbai alumni